The August Holiday, also called the August Bank Holiday, is observed in Ireland on the first Monday of August. It was first observed in 1871, when it was created by the British Act of Parliament, the Bank Holidays Act 1871.

See also
Bank holiday
Lughnasadh

References

Public holidays in the Republic of Ireland
Monday observances
August observances
Holidays and observances by scheduling (nth weekday of the month)